Legislative Assembly elections were held in Delhi in 1993. The result was a victory for the Bhartiya Janata Party, which won 49 of the 70 seats in the Assembly.

State Reorganization
First Legislative Assembly elections in Delhi were held in 1952. But under States Reorganisation Act, 1956, Delhi was made a Union Territory under the direct administration of the President of India and the Delhi Legislative Assembly was abolished simultaneously. So the next legislative assembly elections in Delhi were held in 1993, when Union Territory of Delhi was formally declared as National Capital Territory of Delhi by the Sixty-ninth Amendment to the Indian constitution.

Results

Elected members

See also

 First Legislative Assembly of Delhi
 Second Legislative Assembly of Delhi
 Third Legislative Assembly of Delhi
 Fourth Legislative Assembly of Delhi
 Fifth Legislative Assembly of Delhi
 Sixth Legislative Assembly of Delhi

References

1993
Delhi
1990s in Delhi